The 2021 season was the Baltimore Ravens' 26th season in the National Football League and their 14th under head coach John Harbaugh.

Several NFL records were broken or achieved by the Ravens this season. On August 23, the Baltimore Ravens and John Harbaugh claimed the record of consecutive preseason wins with 20, overtaking Vince Lombardi’s Green Bay Packers record with a win over the Washington Football Team. On September 26, placekicker Justin Tucker broke the NFL record for the longest field goal in history, kicking a 66-yard field goal as time expired to beat the Detroit Lions 19–17. The next week, on October 3, the Ravens tied the record for most consecutive games rushing over 100 yards as a team with 43 (tied with their division rival Steelers) in a 23–7 win over the Denver Broncos.  
 
However, despite starting the season 8–3, the Ravens suffered a late-season collapse, ending the season with a brutal six game losing streak in which five of the losses were by a combined 8 points, including two of the five losses as a result of a failed two-point conversion late in the fourth quarter, and failed to improve on their 11–5 record from last season after a Week 15 loss to the Green Bay Packers. The Ravens also suffered their first losing season since 2015, finished last place in the AFC North for the first time since 2007, and failed to qualify for the postseason for the first time since 2017 after a loss to the Steelers in Week 18. It was the first time in the Lamar Jackson era that the Ravens failed to qualify for the postseason.

The Ravens suffered many injuries to key players throughout the season, including losing J. K. Dobbins, Gus Edwards, Justice Hill, L. J. Fort, and Marcus Peters to season-ending injuries before the regular season started, and losing Ronnie Stanley, Marlon Humphrey, Derek Wolfe, DeShon Elliott and more during the season, while quarterback Lamar Jackson missed the final four games of the season due to an ankle injury. The Ravens ended the season with a league high 19 players on injured reserve. The year was also only the second in Ravens history to not have a Pro Bowler on defense, the other being 2005.

Offseason

Players added

Players lost

2021 NFL Draft

Notes
 Baltimore traded offensive tackle Orlando Brown Jr., their 2021 second-round selection (No. 58) and a 2022 sixth-round selection to Kansas City for their 2021 first-round selection (No. 31), 2021 third-round selection (No. 94), 2021 fourth-round selection (No. 136), and a 2022 fifth-round selection.
 Baltimore traded its third-round selection (No. 91) and a conditional 2022 fifth-round pick to Minnesota in exchange for linebacker Yannick Ngakoue. 
 Baltimore received compensatory third-round selections in 2021 (No. 104) and 2022 when its assistant head coach and passing game coordinator David Culley was hired by Houston as head coach.
 Baltimore traded the fourth-round selection it had earlier acquired from the Kansas City Chiefs (No. 136) and its own sixth-round selection (No. 210) to Arizona for their 5th round selection (No. 160) and a 2022 fourth-round pick.
 Baltimore received a compensatory fifth-round selection (No. 184) in 2021 due to the loss of DT Michael Pierce in free agency the previous offseason.

Undrafted free agent signings

Staff

Final roster

Preseason
The Ravens' preseason opponents and schedule were announced in the spring.

Note
 The Ravens' three preseason victories extended their preseason winning streak to 20 games (an NFL record).

Regular season

Schedule
The Ravens' 2021 schedule was announced on May 12. Apart from their AFC North division games, the Ravens played games against the AFC West and NFC North in accordance with the NFL's schedule rotation. They also played against the Indianapolis Colts, the Miami Dolphins, and the Los Angeles Rams, who finished 2020 in the same position as the Ravens in the two other AFC divisions and the NFC West, which the Ravens would play fully in 2019 and 2023.

Note: Intra-division opponents are in bold text.

Game summaries

Week 1: Las Vegas Raiders 33, Baltimore Ravens 27 (OT)

The Ravens blew multiple fourth quarter leads and lost in overtime 27–33 to the Raiders on Monday Night Football.

The Raiders received the opening kickoff and moved into Baltimore territory before a shotgun snap that was not expected by Las Vegas quarterback Derek Carr led to a 15-yard loss. As a result of the play, the Raiders were forced to punt. The Ravens were unable to do much with the ball and punted as well. A three-and-out series by the Raiders gave the ball to the Ravens at their own 35. The Ravens moved into Raider territory, but were faced with a fourth and one at the Raider 35-yard line. Ty'Son Williams broke through the line on the fourth down play for a 35-yard touchdown run to give Baltimore a 7–0 lead. The teams exchanged punts on their next possessions before the Ravens moved into Raider territory again. Lamar Jackson hit Marquise Brown on a 10-yard touchdown pass with nine minutes remaining in the second quarter and it appeared the Raiders might get blown out. However, on the ensuing possession, Carr was finally able to connect with tight end Darren Waller and move the ball to the Ravens two-yard line before Josh Jacobs scored to cut the lead in half, 14–7. The Ravens again moved into Raider territory with less than two minutes left in the half, but were stopped short on fourth down and turned the ball over to Las Vegas. Carr quickly moved the Raiders to the Baltimore 14-yard line, but had to settle for a Daniel Carlson 34-yard field goal as the half ended leaving the score 14–10 at halftime.

In the second half, the team exchanged punts again before the Ravens connected on a 40-yard field goal by Justin Tucker to move the lead back to seven at 17–10. The Raiders looked to answer by moving in to Raven territory, but were stuffed on a fourth-and-one at the Raven 13. The teams again exchanged punts as the game moved to the fourth quarter. The Ravens took over with 13:23 remaining in the quarter, but Jackson scrambled and had the ball knocked out of his hands and fumbled with the Raiders' Denzel Perryman recovering the ball at the Baltimore 41. Four plays later, Jacobs scored on a 25-yard run to tie the game at 17. The Ravens quickly answered as Latavius Murray scored on an eight-yard touchdown run to give the Ravens a 24–17 lead with about six minutes remaining. Carr moved the Raiders down field and, with just under four minutes left, hit Waller for a 10-yard touchdown pass to again tie the game. Baltimore responded by moving into Raider territory, but were unable to get a first down on a third-down play at the Vegas 31 and were forced to settle for a field goal with 37 seconds remaining. Carr, with no timeouts, hit Bryan Edwards for a 20-yard gain on the first play of the ensuing possession. After a spike to stop the clock, Carr hit Edwards again for 18 yards to move the ball to the Raven 37. Carlson then hit a 55-yard field to tie the game at 27. With two second remaining in the quarter, the Ravens took a knee to settle for overtime.

In overtime, the Raiders won the toss and moved into Raven territory on a pass by Carr to Hunter Renfrow. Renfrow appeared to step out of bounds at least once on the 27-yard play, but no review was made. Two plays later, Carr, backpedaling to avoid the rush, threw a 33-yard touchdown pass to Edwards to apparently win the game. As players celebrated on the field, the play was reviewed and it was determined Edwards was down near the one-yard line, overturning the touchdown. After clearing the field, Carr was stuffed on sneak attempt. Rookie right tackle Alex Leatherwood then committed a false start penalty and the ball was moved back outside the five-yard line. Following an incompletion, Carr's next pass went through the hands of Willie Snead and bounced off a DeShon Elliott's helmet before being intercepted by Anthony Averett in the end zone for a touchback. After the Ravens took over at the 20, Jackson fumbled again which was again recovered by the Raiders. Following a one-yard run to the Ravens' 26, the Raiders belatedly decided to attempt a field goal. However, due to the slow decision, Carlson did not get on the field in time and the Raiders, who had used their two timeouts on the prior possession, committed a delay of game penalty. Jon Gruden decided to not try the field goal on the next play and Carr, under pressure and backpedaling, threw to a wide open Zay Jones for a 31-yard touchdown to end the game.

With the heartbreaking upset loss, the Ravens fell to 0–1 for the first time since 2015. This game marked the 12th game with an upset in Week 1 during the 2021 NFL season an NFL record.

Week 2: Baltimore Ravens 36, Kansas City Chiefs 35

The Ravens overcame two 11-point 2nd half deficits to stun the Chiefs 36–35 on Sunday Night Football, avoiding an 0–2 start. Lamar Jackson ran for two fourth quarter touchdowns on consecutive drives, overcoming two first quarter interceptions, the former of which was a Pick 6, by Tyrann Mathieu. Kansas City then drove into field goal range, but rookie outside linebacker Odafe Oweh forced and recovered a fumble by Clyde Edwards-Helaire at the Baltimore 34-yard line with 1:20 left to go in regulation. The Ravens then forced the Chiefs to use all 3 of their timeouts before Jackson sealed the win with a 2-yard run on 4th and 1 from the Baltimore 43. It was Jackson's first ever win over Patrick Mahomes in four tries as well as the largest deficit he's overcome in his career. It was also the Ravens’ first win over the Chiefs since their 2012 Super Bowl season. With the win, the Ravens improved to 1–1.

Week 3: Baltimore Ravens 19, Detroit Lions 17

The Ravens survived a fourth quarter rally by the Detroit Lions to win 19–17 at Ford Field. After trailing 7–16 going into the fourth quarter, the Lions scored 10 unanswered points, taking the lead with 1:04 left to play on a Ryan Santoso 35-yard field goal. On the ensuing possession, the Ravens faced a 4th & 19 deep in their own territory with less than 30 seconds to go, but Lamar Jackson found Sammy Watkins for a long gain out to the Lions 48 yard line. After spiking the ball, Jackson took four more seconds off the clock by throwing the ball out of bounds, leaving only three seconds on the clock. However, the referees missed that the play clock expired before the play, which should been a five-yard penalty for delay of game. Longtime Ravens kicker Justin Tucker, who missed a 49-yard field goal earlier, then hit an NFL-record 66-yard field goal as time expired to win the game. With the win, the Ravens improved to 2–1.

Week 4: Baltimore Ravens 23, Denver Broncos 7

Facing a 0–7 deficit after a slow start, the Ravens rattled off 17 second quarter points and defeated the Denver Broncos 23–7 for their third straight win. Lamar Jackson threw for 316 yards and a touchdown, his first 300-yard passing game since Week 1 of the 2019 season, while adding 28 yards on the ground. The Ravens also tied the record for most consecutive games rushing over 100 yards as a team with 43 (tied with their division rival, the Steelers) with a 5-yard run by Jackson on the last play of the game. With their third-straight win, the Ravens improved to 3–1.

Week 5: Baltimore Ravens 31, Indianapolis Colts 25 (OT)

Trailing 3–22 late in the third quarter, the Ravens scored four touchdowns in as many drives to defeat the Colts in overtime 31–25 on Monday Night Football. Lamar Jackson had 442 yards passing, both a career high and franchise record, and four touchdowns while adding 62 yards rushing. The Colts also had a field goal blocked with 4:37 left in the fourth quarter and missed a potential game winner at the end of regulation. It was the largest deficit (19 points) that Jackson had overcome in a game, beating out the 11-point deficits he overcame against the Kansas City Chiefs earlier in the season. With their fourth straight win, the Ravens improved to 4–1 and moved into first place in the AFC North due to losses by both the Cleveland Browns and the Cincinnati Bengals.

Week 6: Baltimore Ravens 34, Los Angeles Chargers 6

The Ravens used dominant offensive and defensive performances to rout the Chargers 34–6. Baltimore rushed for 187 yards and three touchdowns while the defense held the Chargers to just 208 yards of total offense and only 26 rushing yards while holding the ball for over 38 minutes. The victory was Lamar Jackson's 35th as a starter, setting the record for the most wins by a starting quarterback before their 25th birthday in NFL history, surpassing the previous mark of 34 set by Dan Marino. With their fifth straight win, the Ravens improved to 5–1.

Week 7: Cincinnati Bengals 41, Baltimore Ravens 17

The Ravens five-game win streak along with their five-straight wins over the Bengals came to a brutal end as the Bengals scored 28 unanswered second half points and routed them 17–41. The Bengals outgained the Ravens 520–393 and had five sacks as Baltimore was 1 for 4 on fourth downs in the second half. It was the Ravens worst home loss since a 6–35 loss to the Seattle Seahawks in Week 14 of the 2015 season and the first time they've lost at home to the Bengals since Week 17 of the 2017 season. It was also Lamar Jackson's worst loss in his career as well as his first lost in the month of October, and his first loss to the Bengals. With the loss, the Ravens dropped to 5–2 and entered a tie with the Bengals for 1st place in the AFC North.

Week 9: Baltimore Ravens 34, Minnesota Vikings 31 (OT)

The Ravens overcame a slow start, two 14-point deficits, and an overtime interception to defeat the Minnesota Vikings 34–31 in overtime. Trailing 3–17 late in the second quarter, the Ravens scored touchdowns on four consecutive long drives to take 31–24 lead late in the fourth quarter behind three touchdown passes by Lamar Jackson and a touchdown run by Le'Veon Bell. However, the Vikings then drove down and tied the game at 31 on an Adam Thielen touchdown reception from Kirk Cousins, his second touchdown pass of the game. In overtime, the Ravens won the toss and drove into Vikings territory, but the drive abruptly ended when a pass by Jackson was tipped and intercepted by Anthony Barr. The Vikings were unable to capitalize, however, as they went three and out and punted the ball back to the Ravens. Needing only a field goal to win, the Ravens again drove into Vikings territory and won on a 36-yard field goal by Justin Tucker. With the win, the Ravens improved to 6–2.

Week 10: Miami Dolphins 22, Baltimore Ravens 10

The Ravens offense struggled to get anything going against the Miami Dolphins, resulting in a stunning 10–22 upset loss on Thursday Night Football. After the first two drives ended in field goal attempts, the second of which was missed, the Ravens failed to score on nine consecutive drives, with seven of them ending in punts, one ending with a lost fumble by Sammy Watkins – which was returned by Xavien Howard for a touchdown –, while one ended by the end of the first half. Meanwhile, the Dolphins scored 15 unanswered points and held off a late comeback attempt by the Ravens to win their second straight game. With the loss, the Ravens fell to 6–3.

Week 11: Baltimore Ravens 16, Chicago Bears 13

Playing without star quarterback Lamar Jackson due to an illness, the Ravens behind second-year QB Tyler Huntley rallied in the final minute to defeat the Chicago Bears 16–13. Earlier in the week, Jackson had designated as questionable due to an undisclosed non-COVID illness. He was removed from the injury report that Friday, but was reinserted on it the next day when his condition abruptly degraded before being ruled out on gameday. Without Jackson, along with wide receiver Marquise Brown, the Ravens struggled to move the ball, but were able to do just enough to take a 9–7 lead late in the fourth quarter on a Justin Tucker 46-yard field goal. On the ensuing drive, however, Andy Dalton, who was in for Justin Fields after the latter suffered a rib injury in the third quarter, threw his second touchdown pass of the day to Marquise Goodwin from 49-yards out on 4th and 11 with less than 1:45 left to go in regulation. Trailing by four after the Bears failed on the two-point conversion, the Ravens quickly drove down the field and retook the lead on a Devonta Freeman 3-yard run touchdown run with just 0:22 to go. The Bears were unable to get into field goal range on their final drive and Dalton was sacked by Tyus Bowser before the former could get off a hail mary throw on the last play of the game. It was the first time the Ravens had defeated the Bears at Soldier Field (they were 0–3 in the stadium prior to this game). With the win, the Ravens improved to 7–3.

Week 12: Baltimore Ravens 16, Cleveland Browns 10

Lamar Jackson and the Ravens overcame four interceptions, including three straight in as many drives in the second quarter, and won their second consecutive game with a 16–10 victory on Sunday Night Football. The Ravens improved to 8–3 and gained control on the number one seed in the AFC.

Week 13: Pittsburgh Steelers 20, Baltimore Ravens 19

The Ravens blew a fourth quarter lead, allowing the Steelers to get 17 points before failing on a two-point conversion on a last-minute touchdown, losing 19–20. Going into the fourth quarter, the Ravens led 10–3, but the Steelers outscored them 17–3, taking a 20–13 lead on a Ben Roethlisberger touchdown pass to Diontae Johnson along with a two-point conversion. The Ravens then quickly drove down the field and Lamar Jackson threw a short touchdown pass to Sammy Watkins with only 12 seconds left. Due to losing CB Marlon Humphrey earlier in the game, leaving them with only 5 CBs available to play, the Ravens attempted to win the game by going for two instead of tying it with an extra point. However, Lamar Jackson pass to Mark Andrews on the attempt was off-target and Andrews was unable to catch it, leaving the Ravens down by one. The Steelers then recovered the onside kick and ran out the clock. With the loss, the Ravens fell to 8–4 out and dropped from the number 1 seed to the 3 seed.

Week 14: Cleveland Browns 24, Baltimore Ravens 22

The Ravens lost their second straight game as their late comeback attempt failed in a 22–24 defeat to the Cleveland Browns. The Ravens lost QB Lamar Jackson to an ankle injury in the first quarter and were down 3–24 late in the second quarter. The defense shut out the Browns in the second half and the Ravens recovered an onside kick following their second fourth quarter touchdown, but were unable to convert on 4th and 6 to get into field goal range. With the loss, the Ravens fell to 8–5.

Week 15: Green Bay Packers 31, Baltimore Ravens 30

A late Ravens comeback attempt fell short due to failing a two-point conversion after a final minute touchdown in a 30–31 loss to the Green Bay Packers. Playing without QB Lamar Jackson due to an ankle injury, backup QB Tyler Huntley attempted to keep up with the Packers offensive attack led by QB Aaron Rodgers. After going into halftime tied at 14, the Packers went ahead 31–17 about midway through the fourth quarter. Tyler Huntley then led a touchdown drive to cut the lead to 7 while the defense forced a three and out. The Ravens drove again and scored again on Huntley scramble with 42 seconds left, his second touchdown run in as many drives. For the second time in three weeks, the Ravens attempted to go for two to take the lead, but Huntley's pass intended for Mark Andrews was broken up leaving the Ravens down by one. The Packers then recovered the onside kick and ran out the clock. With their third straight loss, the Ravens fell out of the playoff picture and dropped to 8–6.

Week 16: Cincinnati Bengals 41, Baltimore Ravens 21

Down to their third string quarterback, the Ravens were unable to keep up with the Bengals offensive attack and were again blown out 21–41. QB Joe Burrow threw for 525 yards and four touchdowns with 184 yards and two of those touchdowns going to WR Tee Higgins on 12 receptions. With QBs Lamar Jackson (ankle injury) and Tyler Huntley (positive COVID-19 test) both out, recently signed Josh Johnson started for the Ravens, throwing for 304 yards, two touchdowns, and an interception in a losing effort. With the loss, the Ravens fell to 8–7 and were swept by the Bengals for the first time since 2015.

Week 17: Los Angeles Rams 20, Baltimore Ravens 19

The Ravens blew yet another fourth quarter lead and lost at home to the Los Angeles Rams 19–20. The Ravens took the lead on a 17-yard interception return touchdown by Chuck Clark in the first quarter, the Ravens' first defensive touchdown of the year and the first of three turnovers committed by Matthew Stafford on the day. Clark picked off Stafford again on the next drive and the Ravens extended their lead to 10–0 on the first of four Justin Tucker field goals. They went into halftime up 13–7 and into the fourth quarter up 16–7. The Rams scored a touchdown early in the quarter before the Ravens began another long drive that got them into the red zone late in the quarter. However, the drive stalled and Tucker kicked a chip shot field goal. The Rams then drove again, converting a fourth down in the red zone and took the lead thanks to Matthew Stafford touchdown pass to Odell Beckham Jr. with less than a minute to go. The Ravens were never able to get into field goal range and Huntley was stripped sacked on the last play of the game. With their fifth straight loss, the Ravens fell to 8–8. With the Steelers' win over the Browns on Monday Night, they fell to third place in the AFC North with only a slim chance to make the playoffs the next week.

Week 18: Pittsburgh Steelers 16, Baltimore Ravens 13 (OT)

The Ravens were eliminated from playoff contention with a brutal loss in overtime at home against the Pittsburgh Steelers, resulting in their sixth straight loss.

In the first quarter, the Steelers scored the only points when Chris Boswell kicked a 28-yard field goal to make it 3–0. The Ravens tied it up at 3–3 in the second quarter when Justin Tucker kicked a 24-yard field goal. This would be the score at halftime. In the third quarter, the Ravens moved into the lead when Latavius Murray ran for a 46-yard touchdown to make it 10–3. The Steelers then came within 4 when Boswell kicked a 40-yard field goal, making the score 10–6. The Ravens drove into the red zone on the next drive, but Tyler Huntley, who was replacing Lamar Jackson for the fourth straight game, threw his second interception of the day in end zone early in the fourth quarter. The Steelers retook the lead in the final three minutes of the fourth when Ben Roethlisberger found Chase Claypool on a 6-yard touchdown pass to make it 13–10. Tucker then tied the game up at 13–13 with a 46-yard field goal. In overtime, the Ravens won the toss, but their drive stalled, forcing them to punt. The Steelers were able to drive down the field, converting a 4th & 8 along the way, and eventually Boswell was brought out to kick the game-winning 36-yard field goal to win the game 16–13.

With the loss, the Ravens extended their losing streak to six games and finished the season with a losing record at 8–9 and in last place of the AFC North for the first time since 2007. Even if the Ravens had won, they still would have been eliminated from playoff contention due to the Miami Dolphins defeating the New England Patriots 33–24 later that afternoon.

Standings

Division

Conference

Individual awards

References

External links
 

Baltimore
Baltimore Ravens seasons
Baltimore Ravens
2020s in Baltimore